The Studebaker Showroom is a historic commercial building at 519 Port Arthur Avenue (corner of De Queen) in downtown Mena, Arkansas. It is a single-story stuccoed concrete block structure with a flat roof. Built in 1948, it is a distinctive local example of the Moderne style, with rounded corners on the corners of the front part of the building. This includes a projecting showroom section and the corners of the main service and sales area behind, which are decorated with banks of glass blocks, another Moderne hallmark.

The building was listed on the National Register of Historic Places in 2000.

See also
National Register of Historic Places listings in Polk County, Arkansas

References

Commercial buildings on the National Register of Historic Places in Arkansas
Streamline Moderne architecture in the United States
Buildings and structures completed in 1948
Buildings and structures in Polk County, Arkansas
National Register of Historic Places in Polk County, Arkansas
Historic district contributing properties in Arkansas